Dave Knight is an American former slalom canoeist who competed in the 1970s. He won a gold medal in the mixed C-2 event at the 1973 ICF Canoe Slalom World Championships in Muotathal.

References

American male canoeists
Possibly living people
Year of birth missing (living people)
Medalists at the ICF Canoe Slalom World Championships